Thomas Henry Wyatt (9 May 1807 – 5 August 1880) was an Anglo-Irish architect. He had a prolific and distinguished career, being elected President of the Royal Institute of British Architects 1870–73 and being awarded its Royal Gold Medal for Architecture in 1873. His reputation during his lifetime was largely as a safe establishment figure, and critical assessment has been less favourable more recently, particularly in comparison with his younger brother, the better known Matthew Digby Wyatt.


Personal and family life

Wyatt was born at Lough-Glin House, County Roscommon. His father was Matthew Wyatt (1773–1831), a barrister and police magistrate for Roscommon and Lambeth. Wyatt is presumed to have moved to Lambeth with his father in 1825 and then initially embarked on a career as a merchant sailing to the Mediterranean, particularly Malta.

He married his first cousin Arabella Montagu Wyatt (1807–1875). She was the second daughter of his uncle Arthur who was an agent to the Duke of Beaufort. This consolidated his practice in Wales.

He lived at and practised from 77 Great Russell Street. He died there on 5 August 1880 leaving an estate of £30,000. He is buried at St Lawrence's Church, Weston Patrick.

The Wyatts were a significant architectural dynasty during the eighteenth and nineteenth centuries.

Career

Training
Wyatt's early training was in the office of Philip Hardwick where he worked until 1832, and was involved in work on Goldsmiths Hall, Euston Station and the warehouses at St Katharine Docks.

Practice
He began practice on his own account in 1832 when he was appointed District Surveyor for Hackney (a post he held until 1861). By 1838 he had acquired substantial patronage from the Duke of Beaufort, the Earl of Denbigh and Sidney Herbert and David Brandon joined him as a partner. This partnership lasted until 1851.

Wyatt's son Matthew (1840–1892) became his father's partner in 1860.

Positions
Wyatt was appointed as consulting or honorary architect to a number of bodies including:
the Institution of Civil Engineers
The Athenaeum
Governesses Benevolent Association
Middlesex Hospital
Lunacy Commissioners
Incorporated Church Building Society
Diocese of Salisbury

Architectural works

Wyatt worked in many styles ranging from the Italianate of Wilton through to the Gothic of many of his churches.

His practice was extensive with a large amount of work in Wiltshire largely as a result of his official position and the patronage of the Herbert family, and in Monmouthshire through the Beaufort connection

Wiltshire
Wyatt secured much work in Wiltshire, including the building of 20 churches, after offering his services for free to the Salisbury Diocesan Church Building Association in 1836. Julian Orbach considers the large new church at Wilton – "on a heroic scale" – to have made Wyatt's reputation.

Below is a selective list of some of Wyatt's major works with some links to relevant information

Churches

Houses

Public buildings

Monmouthshire
The Hendre was built in 1837/9 near Monmouth for the Rolls family.

Llantarnam Abbey was built in 1834/1835 for Reginald Blewitt: a large mansion in the Elizabethan style, built on a dissolution site.  Once again an abbey, in possession of the Sisters of St. Joseph.

The Church of St Thomas the Martyr, Monmouth was renovated by Wyatt.

Usk Sessions House was built in 1875–1877.

Other works:

London

Knightsbridge Barracks
The Knightsbridge Barracks were built in 1878/9.

Other

Somerset

Cambridgeshire

Lancashire including Liverpool

Glamorgan and rest of Wales

Herefordshire

Hampshire

Gloucestershire

Elsewhere

Bibliography
The Wyatts, an Architectural Dynasty  J M Robinson

See also
Wyatt family

References

External links

Watercolour by Wyatt of his New Liverpool Exchange, 1860s or 1870s

1807 births
1880 deaths
19th-century Irish architects
People from County Roscommon
Recipients of the Royal Gold Medal
Presidents of the Royal Institute of British Architects
Thomas Henry